Gilles Bosquet (born 14 July 1974 in Reims) is a French rower.

References 
 
 

1974 births
Living people
French male rowers
Sportspeople from Reims
Rowers at the 1996 Summer Olympics
Rowers at the 2000 Summer Olympics
Olympic silver medalists for France
Olympic rowers of France
World Rowing Championships medalists for France
Medalists at the 1996 Summer Olympics
20th-century French people